Christmas Queens 3 is a holiday compilation album, released in 2017. The album is the third installation in a similarly-named series, following Christmas Queens and Christmas Queens 2, and features Alaska Thunderfuck, Bob the Drag Queen, Peppermint, Phi Phi O'Hara, and Sharon Needles, among others.

Track listing

Track listing adapted from the iTunes Store.

References

2017 compilation albums
2017 Christmas albums
Christmas compilation albums
Pop Christmas albums
RuPaul's Drag Race albums
Producer Entertainment Group albums